"Part of Me" is a song by New Zealand band Stellar*, released as the second single from their debut album, Mix (1999), in April 1999. This song was the group's first top 10 single on New Zealand's RIANZ Singles Chart, spending two weeks at four before dropping out of the top 10. The single includes two B-sides: "Sorry" and "Trepanning (Out with the Sun)".

Background
Stellar* have said that "Part of Me" is their favourite track on Mix despite the fact it was the album's only track not mixed at a professional studio. On 16 June 199, Christchurch Star writer Chris Mooar gave the song a five-star review, praising the composition and Boh Runga's vocals while calling it "pop music at its most intelligent".

Track listing
New Zealand CD single
 "Part of Me"
 "Sorry"
 "Trepanning (Out with the Sun)"

Credits and personnel
Credits are lifted from the Stellar* website.

Studios
 Recorded at Revolver (Auckland, New Zealand) and Soundtrax Studios
 Mastered at York Street (Auckland, New Zealand)

Personnel
 Boh Runga – writing
 Tom Bailey – production
 Stellar* – production, mixing
 Luke Tomes – mixing, engineering
 Gavin Botica – mastering

Charts

References

1999 singles
1999 songs
Epic Records singles
Songs written by Boh Runga
Stellar (New Zealand band) songs